The 2014–15 Ford Trophy was the 44th season of the official List A cricket tournament in New Zealand, and the fourth in a sponsorship deal between New Zealand Cricket and Ford Motor Company. The competition ran from 27 December 2014 to 1 February 2015. The tournament was won by Central Districts for the fifth time, after defeating Auckland in the final by 73 runs.

Points table

 Teams qualified for the finals

Finals

1st Preliminary Final

2nd Preliminary Final

3rd Preliminary Final

Final

References

External links
 Series home at ESPN Cricinfo

Ford Trophy
2014–15 New Zealand cricket season
Ford Trophy